Harald Martenstein (born 9 September 1953, in Mainz) is a German journalist and author.

Biography 
Martenstein studied History and Romance Studies in Freiburg. From 1981 to 1988, he was a journalist at the Stuttgarter Zeitung and from 1988 to 1997 he was a journalist at Tagesspiegel in Berlin. Then, Martenstein took up for a short time the line of the culture editorship at the Abendzeitung (AZ) in Munich. However, he returned a little later as senior editor to the Tagesspiegel.  Since 2002, he has written a column for Die Zeit titled "Lebenszeichen", which since May 24, 2007 appears in Zeit-Magazin LEBEN (a supplement to Die Zeit)  as "Harald Martenstein". Since 2004 Martenstein also writes a column for GEO Kompakt. His second novel, Gefühlte Nähe (Felt close)  received rather critical reviews.

In 2004, he received the Egon-Erwin-Kisch-Preis for the second best investigative report published in German in 2004. Martenstein had dealt with the internal conflicts in Suhrkamp, a major publisher of literary works with longstanding legal conflicts between its owners.

In February 2007, Martenstein's novel debut Heimweg was released and later won the Corine Debütpreis. He has also published several volumes of his collected columns under different titles.

Martenstein lives in Berlin-Kreuzberg.

Works 
 Männer sind wie Pfirsiche. C. Bertelsmann, München, 2007, 
 Heimweg. Roman, C. Bertelsmann, München, Feb. 2007, 
 Vom Leben gezeichnet. Tagebuch eines Endverbrauchers. Hoffmann und Campe, Hamburg, August 2004.
 Wachsen Ananas auf Bäumen? Wie ich meinem Kind die Welt erkläre. Hoffmann und Campe, Hamburg 2001.
 Spot aus! Licht an! Meine Story, zus. mit Ilja Richter, Hoffmann und Campe, Hamburg 1999.
 Das hat Folgen. Deutschland und seine Fernsehserien. Reclam, Leipzig 1996.
 Die Mönchsrepublik. Erotik in der deutschen Politik von Adenauer bis Claudia Nolte''. Fannei & Walz, Berlin 1994.

External links

Kurz-Rezensionen zu Heimweg (Perlentaucher)

References 

1953 births
German journalists
German male journalists
German newspaper journalists
20th-century German journalists
21st-century German journalists
Living people
German male writers
Die Zeit people
Der Tagesspiegel people
Writers from Mainz
Stuttgarter Zeitung people